Palace of Justice may refer to:

Places
 Istanbul Justice Palace, Turkey
 Justizpalast (Munich), Germany
 Palace of Justice Antwerp, Belgium
 Palace of Justice (Nuremberg), Germany
 Palace of Justice of Brussels, also known as the Law Courts of Brussels
 Argentine National Justice Palace, Buenos Aires
 Palace of Justice (Bucharest), Romania
 Palace of Justice (Malaysia)
 Palace of Justice (Peru)
 Palace of Justice (Pristina), Kosovo
 Palace of Justice (Riga), Latvia
 Palace of Justice, Rome, Italy
 Palace of Justice (Rosario), Argentina
 Palace of Justice (Valencia) (Palacio de Justicia), Spain
 Palace of Justice, Vienna, Austria
 Palais de justice de Montréal, Canada
 Palais de Justice, Luxembourg, the home of the European Court of Justice
 Palais de Justice, Paris
 Palais de Justice, Rouen
 Palace of Justice of Aix-en-Provence, France
 Palace of Justice of Colombia
 Palace of Justice (South Africa), Pretoria
 Royal Courts of Justice, London
 Former palace of Justice of Douala, Douala
 Castellania (Valletta), Malta, known as the Palais de Justice in 1798–1800
 Zrenjanin Court House, Serbia, known as the Palace of Justice

Events
 Palace of Justice siege, siege of the Colombian Palace of Justice

fr:Palais de Justice